Bunuraja, Bunuraya, Bunu-raja is a village (kampong) in northern Sumatra, Indonesia.

References

Populated places in North Sumatra